The 1909 Mississippi A&M Aggies baseball team represented the Mississippi Aggies of Mississippi A&M in the 1909 IAAUS baseball season.  The Aggies were led by Dolly Stark in his first and only season as head coach.  They finished as co-champions of the SIAA with a 10–2 record, 22–4 overall.

Schedule and results

References

Mississippi State Bulldogs
Mississippi State Bulldogs baseball seasons
Southern Intercollegiate Athletic Association baseball champion seasons